Moto G6 (stylized by Motorola as moto g6) is a series of Android smartphones developed by Motorola Mobility, a subsidiary of Lenovo. It is the sixth generation of the Moto G family. There are three models, the g6, g6 plus and g6 play. Only the g6 and g6 Play are available in the United States.

Release 
Announced as successors to the Moto G5, the phones were scheduled to be released on the May 9, 2018 in several markets including Europe, South America, North America and parts of Asia; however, Motorola missed its release date for North America and India.

North America 
The G6 was made available in the United States by May 23, 2018 from Boost Mobile, and on the following day through Verizon Wireless. It was later made available on Amazon for a discounted price. On June 5, the G6 was made available for purchase in Motorola's United States website.

The G6 Plus was not released in the United States, likely due to its similarities to the already available Moto X4.

South America 
The G6 series was released in Brazil on April 19, 2018.

India 
The G6 and G6 Play were released in India on June 4, 2018. The G6 Plus was released on September 10, 2018.

Software 
The G6 series was released with Android 8 "Oreo". An update to Android 9 "Pie" for the G6 Plus was rolled out to various countries in January 2019. In February 2019, the update was rolled out for the G6 Play and G6 in Brazil, and was expected to be released worldwide at a later date. 

The Pie update reached Australia on February 4 for the G6 Plus, March 20 for the G6, and the G6 Play a week later.

In March 2019 there were articles  claiming that the G6 series would receive an official Android 10 update. Later articles, however, claimed to quote a new Motorola policy wherein G-series phones would only receive 1 major Android version upgrade, i.e., the G6 would receive the upgrade from 8.0 (Oreo) to 9.0 (Pie) but not any other upgrade.

G6 
The Android Pie update was rolled out on February 6, 2019, to the United States, then reached Brazil on February 15. Australian devices received the update on March 20, and users in India received the update on March 21.

G6 Play 
The Android Pie update reached G6 Play users in Brazil on February 16, 2019, then rolled out in India two days later. It reached United Kingdom users on April 1, 2019.

G6 Plus 
The Android Pie update was rolled out to G6 Plus users in India on December 31, 2018. It then reached the United States on January 8, 2019.

Known issues 
Videos recorded on the Moto G6 sometimes have distorted audio. The audio cuts off when using headphones and volume levels below 50%. Motorola is aware of these issues and looking for a fix.

Several users reported on Motorola's forums about degraded audio quality after the Android 9 "Pie" update.

Reception 
The G6 series has been received well by reviewers for its features relative to its low to mid range price. Wired praised the G6's "class-leading tech" and stated that the "accessible" price "highlights the impending identity crisis of expensive phones". CNET rated the G6 four out of five stars, calling the G6 "a sublime value" and stating "a budget phone shouldn't be this good".

In India, the price tag of 22,499 rupees for the G6 Plus drew some criticism for being the most expensive Moto G phone at the time of release, a sharp increase from the previous year's price of about 16,000 rupees for the G5 Plus and G5s Plus.

Specifications 
The specification varies slightly between countries.

References

Android (operating system) devices
Mobile phones introduced in 2018
Mobile phones with multiple rear cameras
Motorola smartphones